Svitlana Gorbenko is a Paralympian athlete from Ukraine competing mainly in category F13 long jump and T13 sprint  events.

She competed in the 2004 Summer Paralympics in Athens, Greece in both the T13 100m and F13 long jump she failed to win a medal in either event.  She did better in the 2008 Summer Paralympics in Beijing, China where she concentrated on the F13 long jump and came away with a bronze medal.

External links
 

Paralympic athletes of Ukraine
Athletes (track and field) at the 2004 Summer Paralympics
Athletes (track and field) at the 2008 Summer Paralympics
Paralympic bronze medalists for Ukraine
Ukrainian female long jumpers
Ukrainian female sprinters
Living people
Year of birth missing (living people)
Medalists at the 2008 Summer Paralympics
Paralympic medalists in athletics (track and field)
21st-century Ukrainian women